Georges Van Calenberg (6 December 1912 – 28 June 1973) was a Belgian footballer. He played in eight matches for the Belgium national football team from 1939 to 1940.

References

External links
 

1912 births
1973 deaths
Belgian footballers
Belgium international footballers
Place of birth missing
Association footballers not categorized by position